Ronga (XiRonga; sometimes ShiRonga or GiRonga) is a Bantu language of the Tswa–Ronga branch spoken just south of Maputo in Mozambique.  It extends a little into South Africa. It has about 650,000 speakers in Mozambique and a further 90,000 in South Africa, with dialects including Konde, Putru and Kalanga.

The Swiss philologist Henri Alexandre Junod seems to have been the first linguist to have studied it, in the late 19th century.

Phonology

Alphabet
Its alphabet is similar to that of Tsonga as provided by Methodist missionaries and Portuguese settlers.

Grammar
Ronga is grammatically so close to Tsonga in many ways that census officials have often considered it a dialect; its noun class system is very similar and its verbal forms are almost identical. Its most immediately noticeable difference is a much greater influence from Portuguese, due to being centred near the capital Maputo (formerly Lourenço Marques).

Literature
It was published by the British and Foreign Bible Society in 1896. Further translation was done by Pierre Loze from Mission Romande (Swiss Romande Mission) and H.L. Bishop (Wesleyan Methodist Missionary Society), assisted by  Jeremia Caetano and Efraim Hely. The New Testament was published in 1903, and the whole Bible was published by the British and Foreign Bible Society in 1923.

References

Languages of Mozambique
Tswa-Ronga languages
Click languages